Doctor Detective is a 2019 South Korean television series starring Park Jin-hee, Bong Tae-gyu and Lee Ki-woo. It aired from July 17 to September 5, 2019 on SBS.

Synopsis
The story of doctors who try to uncover the truth behind industrial accidents. It also factors in real life occupational hazard events that happened to real South Korean citizens by tailoring the drama to the real life event.

Cast

Main
 Park Jin-hee as Do Joong-eun
 Bong Tae-gyu as Heo Min-ki
 Lee Ki-woo as Choi Tae-yeong

Supporting

Undiagnosed Disease Center
 Park Ji-young as Gong Il-soon
 Lee Young-jin as Byeon Jeong-ho
 Mina Fujii as Seok Jin-i
 Jung Kang-hee as Ha Jin-hak
 Lee Yeong-seok as Mr. Go

TL Medical Center
 Ryu Hyun-kyung as Choi Min
 Lee Chul-min as Mr. Kwon
 Choi Kwang-il as Mo Seong-gook

Others
 Park Joo-hyung as Im Gook-sin
 Jung Soon-won as Team leader Jeong
 Kwon Hyuk-bum as Kim Do-hyeong
 Bae Noo-ri as Park Hye-mi
 Moon Tae-yu as Kwon Jun-il
 Kim Min-ho as Kwon Do-yoon
 Chae Yoo-ri as Choi Seo-rin
 Park Geun-hyung as Choi Gon
 Shin Dam-soo as Mr. Go
 Lee Yoon-sang as President
 Cha Soon-bae as General manager
 Roh Haeng-ha as Kim Yang-hee
 Park Sung-joon

Special appearances
 Kwak Dong-yeon as Jeong Ha-rang
 Hwang Jung-min as Ha-rang's mother
 Oh Dong-min as Bakery president
 Jang Won-hyung
 Yoon So-yi as Yoon Si-wol

Original soundtrack

Part 1

Part 2

Part 3

Ratings
 In this table,  represent the lowest ratings and  represent the highest ratings.
 Each night's broadcast is divided into two 30-minute parts with a commercial break in between.

References

External links
  
 
 

Seoul Broadcasting System television dramas
Korean-language television shows
2019 South Korean television series debuts
2019 South Korean television series endings
Television series by Studio S